Jagat Singh Negi (born 2 February 1957) is the Member of the Legislative Assembly from Kinnaur, India. He was the Deputy Speaker of Himachal Pradesh Legislative Assembly from March, 2013 to December, 2017. He is an Indian politician and a member of Indian National Congress and Horticulture, Revenue and Tribal Minister of Himachal Pradesh.

In 2015 he along with Sunder Singh Verma had attended Fifth India Region CPA Conference.

References

External links
Himachal Pradesh Vidhan Sabha

People from Kinnaur district
Indian National Congress politicians
Himachal Pradesh MLAs 2012–2017
Deputy Speakers of the Himachal Pradesh Legislative Assembly
1957 births
Living people
Janata Dal politicians